Multivitellina is a genus of trematodes in the family Opecoelidae. It consists of one species, Multivitellina idahoensis Schell, 1974.

References

Opecoelidae
Trematode genera
Monotypic protostome genera